Lost in Space is an American science fiction streaming television series following the adventures of a family of space colonists whose ship veers off course.  The series is a reboot of the 1965 series of the same name, inspired by the 1812 novel The Swiss Family Robinson and the 1962 Gold Key comic book Space Family Robinson, created by Del Connell and artist Dan Spiegle.

Produced by Legendary Television, Synthesis Entertainment, Clickety-Clack Productions, and Applebox Entertainment, the show is written by Matt Sazama and Burk Sharpless, with Zack Estrin serving as showrunner. Netflix released the series on April 13, 2018, renewing it the following month for a second season. The second season premiered on December 24, 2019. The third and final season was released on December 1, 2021.

Premise
In 2046, two years after an impact event that threatens the survival of humanity, the Robinson family is selected for the 24th mission of the Resolute (24th Colonist Group), an interstellar spacecraft carrying selected families and civilians to colonize the Alpha Centauri planetary system.

Before they reach their destination, an alien robot breaches the Resolutes hull. Forced to evacuate the mothership in numerous short-range Jupiter spacecraft, scores of colonists, among them the Robinsons, crash on a nearby habitable planet. There they must contend with a strange environment and battle their own personal demons as they search for a way back to the Resolute.

Cast

Main
 Molly Parker as Maureen Robinson, an aerospace engineer who serves as the mission commander for the Jupiter 2, taking her family on the mission to colonize Alpha Centauri in hopes of building a new life on a better world. Married to John Robinson, she is Judy, Penny, and Will Robinson's mother.
 Toby Stephens as John Robinson, former U.S. Navy SEAL and husband to Maureen. He is father to Penny and Will and stepfather to Judy.
 Maxwell Jenkins as Will Robinson, Maureen and John's youngest child who forms a tight bond with the Robot, which he saves from destruction during a forest fire. Will is the youngest child prodigy of the family.
 Taylor Russell as Judy Robinson, Maureen's eldest child and John's stepdaughter who serves as mission doctor, having received accelerated medical training and earns her medical license by age 18.
 Mina Sundwall as Penny Robinson, Maureen and John's younger daughter who becomes inspired to write about her experiences. She's also the rebellious one of the family, sneaking out of their space ship frequently.
 Ignacio Serricchio as Don West, a ship mechanic and smuggler of luxury goods. He is accompanied by his lucky chicken, Debbie.
 Parker Posey as June Harris / Zoe Smith, a petty criminal who assumes the identity of her sister, Jessica, to take her place on the Resolute. She subsequently steals and alters the credentials of Dr. Zachary Smith during the first attack to become "Dr. Zoe Smith" and take his seat on an evacuating Jupiter ship. The theft of the doctor's identity is a reference to the corresponding character of Dr. Smith in the original television series (also, her character, June Harris, is named for June Lockhart, who played Maureen Robinson, and Jonathan Harris, who played Smith on the original series).
 Brian Steele as the Robot (seasons 2–3; recurring season 1), an alien robot being that Will encounters after the crash. The robot has a different form from the ones that appeared in the previous series and film.
 Ajay Friese as Vijay Dhar (season 2; recurring seasons 1, 3), Victor's son and Penny's love interest.
 Sibongile Mlambo as Angela Goddard (season 2; recurring season 1), an engineer and fellow survivor struggling with post traumatic stress disorder in the wake of her husband's death during the attack on the Resolute. Her character is named for Angela Cartwright, who played Penny Robinson in the original television series, and Mark Goddard, who played Don West in the original series.

Recurring

Introduced in season 1
 Raza Jaffrey as Victor Dhar, the representative of the 24th Colony group and father to Vijay. 
 Cary-Hiroyuki Tagawa as Hiroki Watanabe (season 1), a biologist and friend of Maureen's.
 Yukari Komatsu as Naoko Watanabe, Hiroki's daughter who's considered the best pilot among the colonists.
 Kiki Sukezane as Aiko Watanabe, Hiroki's granddaughter.
 Veenu Sandhu as Prisha Dhar, Victor's wife.
 Adam Greydon Reid as Peter Beckert, a survivor of the Resolute and Victor's associate.
 Amelia Burstyn as Diane, the communications officer on the Resolute.
 Iain Belcher as Evan, an electrician and survivor on the unknown planet.
 Shaun Parkes as Captain I. Radic, commander of the Resolute in charge of security operations.
 Rowan Schlosberg as Connor, a survivor of the Resolute on the unknown planet.
 Viv Leacock as Reese, a survivor of the Resolute. He has several children, including Noah.

Introduced in season 2
 Douglas Hodge as Officer Hastings, an intelligence officer on the Resolute who wants to get the ship to Alpha Centauri at all costs, including stranding hundreds of colonists on an alien planet.
 JJ Feild as Ben Adler, head of the Advanced Technology unit on the Resolute. He seeks to understand the robots and their technology. He was married to Amanda and had two sons.
 Sakina Jaffrey as Captain Kamal (season 2), who becomes commander of the Resolute following the incapacitation of Captain Radic.
 Tattiawna Jones as Ava, the head mechanic on the Resolute and Don's superior.
 Aria DeMaris as Isabel Azevedo, a physicist and passenger on the Resolute. She is married to Aubrey and is one of Elise's mothers.
 Alison Araya as Aubrey Azevedo, a physicist and passenger on the Resolute. She is married to Isabel and is one of Elise's mothers.
 Nevis Unipan as Samantha, a little girl who was left on the Resolute following the evacuation. She befriends the Robinsons.

Introduced in season 3
 Russell Hornsby as Grant Kelly, Judy's biological father and the commander of the ill-fated Fortuna mission. 
 Charles Vandervaart as Liam Tufeld, Penny's new love interest.
 Elias Leacock as Noah, a child who was stranded in the Jupiter transporter.

Guest
 AnnaMaria Demara as Tam Roughneck, a mechanic and friend to Don West.
 Selma Blair as Jessica Harris, June's wealthy younger sister.
 Bill Mumy as Zachary Smith, the real Dr. Smith whose identity June steals. As a child, Mumy portrayed Will Robinson in the original Lost in Space series from 1965 to 1968.
 June Lockhart as June (denoted by subtitles), a radio communications officer on Alpha Centauri (credited as "the Voice of Alpha Control"). June Lockhart portrayed Maureen Robinson in the original television series, and the principal of Will Robinson's school in the 1998 film.
 Angela Cartwright as Sheila Harris, June's mother. As a child, Cartwright portrayed Penny Robinson in the original Lost in Space series from 1965 to 1968. She also made a cameo, as a reporter, in the 1998 film.
 Rob LaBelle as Mr. Jackson, the school teacher aboard the Resolute.
 Karen LeBlanc as the chancellor of the Alpha Centauri base.

Episodes

Season 1 (2018)

Season 2 (2019)

Season 3 (2021)

Production

Development
In October 2014, it was announced that Legendary Television and Synthesis Entertainment were developing a new reboot of Lost in Space and had hired screenwriting duo Matt Sazama and Burk Sharpless to pen the pilot episodes. In November 2015, Netflix landed the project. On June 29, 2016, Netflix ordered a full 10-episode season of Lost in Space, with Zack Estrin as executive producer and showrunner. Sazama, Sharpless, Kevin Burns, Jon Jashni, Neil Marshall, and Marc Helwig also serve as executive producers.

Filming
Production on the first season began in February 2017 in Vancouver, British Columbia, and concluded in July 2017. The second season began production in Iceland in September 2018, and concluded in January 2019. Filming for the third and final season began in British Columbia on September 9, 2020, and concluded on January 14, 2021.

Release
On March 31, 2018, the series pilot was screened at Awesome Con in Washington, D.C. The first season, consisting of 10 episodes, was released on April 13, 2018, on Netflix. On June 4, 2019, 20th Century Fox Home Entertainment released DVDs and Blu-rays of the first season titled "Lost In Space: The Complete First Season". The second season, also consisting of 10 episodes, was released on December 24, 2019, on Netflix. The third and final season, consisting of eight episodes, was released on December 1, 2021.

Reception

Critical response
The review aggregator website Rotten Tomatoes reported a 68% approval rating based on 75 reviews, for the first season, with an average rating of 6.43/10. The website's critics consensus reads: "Lost in Spaces production values are ambitious enough to attract sci-fi adventure fans, while the story's large heart adds an emotional anchor to all the deep space derring-do." Metacritic, which uses a weighted average, assigned a normalized score of 58 out of 100 based on 27 critics for the first season, indicating "mixed or average reviews".

David Griffin of IGN gave the first season a rating of 8.5/10, calling it "an excellent sci-fi adventure with a slight villain problem", giving particular praise to the Robinson family, while criticizing Parker Posey's Dr. Smith as an unsophisticated and one-dimensional character who lacks redeeming qualities. In contrast, Jen Chaney of Vulture characterized Posey's performance as providing "understated, sly comedic touches", and Beth Elderkin of Gizmodo agreed: "Her performance definitely includes the character’s trademark levity and humor."

On Rotten Tomatoes the second season has an approval rating of 85% based on 13 reviews, with an average rating of 6.6/10. The website's critics consensus states: "Gorgeous effects and a simple, solid, story help Lost in Spaces second season find itself on stronger ground."

Dylan Roth of Polygon gave the third season a mostly positive review, calling it an "exciting, delightful, and self-contained space adventure that stands in contrast against the ever more complex universes of its contemporaries." Roth criticized the character of Dr. Smith however, and the overall writing of the show's antagonists. Renaldo Matadeen of CBR criticized the show's handling of Dr. Smith's narrative arc.

Accolades

References

External links
 
 

2010s American drama television series
2010s American science fiction television series
2020s American drama television series
2020s American science fiction television series
2018 American television series debuts
2021 American television series endings
English-language television shows
Lost in Space
English-language Netflix original programming
Television series by Legendary Television
Post-apocalyptic television series
Post-apocalyptic web series
Space adventure television series
Television series about families
Television shows filmed in Vancouver
Television series reboots
Television series set in the 2040s
Television series set on fictional planets
Television series about being lost from home